Megachile sauteri is a species of bee in the family Megachilidae. It was described by Hedicke in 1940.

References

Sauteri
Insects described in 1940